The Volkswagen Eos was a sport compact cabriolet coupé produced by the German automaker Volkswagen from 2006 to 2015. Assembled at AutoEuropa in Portugal, it was a convertible only compact coupé introduced as the successor of the Volkswagen Golf Cabriolet. It was Volkswagen's first production coupé since the Volkswagen Corrado, which ended production in July 1995.

The name Eos was derived from Eos, the Greek goddess of the dawn. The Eos ended production in May 2015. However, a limited number of base trim models were sold as models of 2016 in the United States.

History

Prior to production, the Eos was shown as the Concept C concept car at the 2004 Geneva Motor Show — designed by a team headed by Peter Schreyer, Head of Volkswagen Design in Wolfsburg.  Other sources attribute the design of the Eos specifically to Slovenian Robert Lešnik.

The production Eos, produced at the AutoEuropa plant in Portugal, was presented in September 2005, at the Frankfurt Motor Show, with the North American introduction at the Los Angeles Auto Show in January 2006.

Unlike the Cabrio, which was a convertible version of the Golf hatchback, the Eos was a standalone model with all new body panels, although it shared the platform and components from the Volkswagen Golf (Mk5). The wheelbase matches the Golf Mk5 and Jetta.

Roof design

The Eos incorporates into its five piece folding roof an integrated and independently sliding glass sunroof — making the Eos the only retractable hardtop of this kind.

The roof was designed and is built by OASys, a subsidiary of Webasto Germany. The design of the roof system is complex with its own hydraulic control system and numerous rubber seals. Periodic maintenance must be done to keep the seals conditioned so that they function properly. 

Early models had a different seal design that was prone to leaking, but these were updated in the 2009/2010 timeframe. Proper body alignment is critical for proper top function.

Facelift

A facelifted Volkswagen Eos appeared in October 2010, and went on sale as a model of 2012 outside Europe. This facelift includes a revised front and rear fascias, headlights and tail lights, side mirrors, as well as new wheel designs.

Eos White Night
The White Night edition was a special edition with custom wheels, custom black interior and a black and white colour scheme package. It includes Candy White coloured body, Deep Black Pearlescent coloured roof, cherry red LED tail lights, 18 inch Budapest wheels. 

Other features include black mirror covers, radiator grille and trim strips, black Nappa leather seats, door and side trim and black steering wheel with light coloured seams, trim strips and radio trim in candy white, sill panel strips with white night letters. Other features include climatronic climate control system, sports chassis lowered  and heated front seats. This option is available with all non V6 models.

United States Final Edition
Sales of the Eos steadily declined, as hardtop convertibles fell out of favour with buyers. In addition, the Eos was based on the Mark 5 platform, and by 2014, it had become one of the last models produced on it. With sales declining, Volkswagen elected to not migrate the model to a more current platform, as a redesign would have proven costly. 

During 2014, Volkswagen announced that the model would be discontinued with a close of the model year of 2015, and Volkswagen produced a Final Edition trim to mark the occasion. 

This 2015 only version slotted into a mid trim range in the United States, and replaced the Sport trim previously sold there. The Final Edition was basically a Sport trim with special two tone beige/black leather upholstery and a back up camera with park distance control added. The Final Edition was available in three basic colours: black, brown and white.

2016 United States wrap up
In August 2015, Volkswagen announced that there would be a very limited run of Eos cars of 2016 in the basic Komfort trim only. In October 2015, at least one dealer was quoted as saying only 1,300 cars were made available for the United States in four colours: black, brown, red and white. Since 2014, the Komfort trim had developed to include a fairly rich complement of standard features to include in dash navigation. By May 2016, the cars were all but gone from dealers.

Drivetrain

International markets

The Eos was released in Europe in the first quarter of 2006, and in North America in the third quarter of 2006. Right hand drive markets, such as Japan, began sales in October 2006, followed by New Zealand and Australia in January 2007. It was released in South Africa in the second quarter of 2007.

References

External links

Eos at Volkswagen International
A link to an article of the Eos' inspiration, the Concept C.

Eos
Sport compact cars
Euro NCAP small family cars
Front-wheel-drive sports cars
Hardtop convertibles
Cars introduced in 2006
Cars of Portugal
Cars powered by VR engines
2010s cars